A Bad Day for Sorry is a novel written by Sophie Littlefield and published by Minotaur Books (an imprint on St. Martin's Press owned by Macmillan Publishers) on 4 August 2009, which later went on to win the Anthony Award for Best First Novel in 2010.

References 

2009 American novels
Anthony Award-winning works
American mystery novels
American thriller novels
Minotaur Books books